Ellesmere may refer to:

Places

Australia 
 Ellesmere, Queensland, a locality in the South Burnett Region, Queensland
 the former name of Scottsdale, Tasmania, Australia

Canada 
 Ellesmere Island, an Arctic island of Canada and named for Francis Egerton, 1st Earl of Ellesmere
 Ellesmere Road, an arterial road in Toronto, Ontario, Canada and named after Ellesmere, Shropshire
 Ellesmere station, on the Toronto subway in Canada

New Zealand 
 Ellesmere, New Zealand, a locality in the Canterbury region of the South Island of New Zealand
 Lake Ellesmere / Te Waihora, a lake near Ellesmere
 Ellesmere (New Zealand electorate), an historic New Zealand electorate

United Kingdom 
 Ellesmere, Shropshire, a market town in Shropshire, England
 Ellesmere Castle
 Ellesmere Rural, a civil parish to the west
 Ellesmere Park, area of Eccles, Greater Manchester, England
 Ellesmere Port, an industrial town in Cheshire, England
 Ellesmere Port and Neston, a former district and borough in Cheshire, England
 Ellesmere Canal, a canal in the United Kingdom, now known as the Llangollen Canal

Other
 Francis Egerton, 1st Earl of Ellesmere, a 19th-century English politician and patron of the arts
 Earl of Ellesmere, title in the Peerage of the UK
 Ellesmere Choi, Hong Kong TVB actor

See also
 Ellesmere College (disambiguation)
 
 Elmore (disambiguation)
 Elsmere (disambiguation)
 Elsmore (disambiguation)

ru:Элсмир